Lily Lake may refer to:

Canada
Lily Lake (Nova Scotia), one of several lakes in Nova Scotia
Lily Lake, a lake in Rockwood Park, Saint John, New Brunswick

United States
Lily Lake (Florida), a lake inside Lily Lake Golf Resort, in southern Polk County, Florida
Lily Lake (Blue Earth County, Minnesota)
Lily Lake, a lake in Waseca County, Minnesota
Lily Lake (Washington County, Minnesota)
Lily Lake (New York)
Lily Lake (Idaho), a lake in Custer County
Lily Lake, Illinois, a town in western Kane County
Lily Lake (Pennsylvania), a lake in Luzerne County
Lily Lake, Wisconsin, an unincorporated community

See also
 Lily Pond (disambiguation)